KCHP-LP (97.1 FM) is a radio station licensed to Arcata, California, United States. The station is currently owned by Calvary Chapel of Arcata.

References

External links
 

CHP
CHP-LP